Joakim Lartey is a percussionist, born October 27, 1953 in Ghana. He has played with Singer Natalie Merchant, John Hall, and renowned jazz drummer Jack DeJohnette.

Joakim studied at Prempeh College in Kumasi, Ghana and then at Vassar College, Poughkeepsie, New York as well as The Creative Music Studio, Woodstock, New York.

He also attended Hoquiam High School in Hoquiam, Washington as an exchange student during the 1971-1972 school year.

References

External links 
 

American drummers
Living people
Year of birth missing (living people)